Elections to the Adur District Council were held on 8 May 1986, with minor boundary changes taking effect, impacting the Peverel ward. One third of the council was due for re-election, with additional vacancies in Buckingham, Churchill and Mash Barn wards. No elections were to be held for the single-member St Mary's ward. The formerly Conservative councillor for Southwick Green was defending the seat as an Independent, with no Conservative contesting that ward. Overall turnout was down slightly to 45.3%.

The election resulted in the Alliance regaining control of the council.

Election result

This resulted in the following composition of the council:

Ward results

+/- figures represent changes from the last time these wards were contested.

References

1986
1986 English local elections
1980s in West Sussex